The Northumberland Miners' Association was a trade union in the United Kingdom.

The union was founded in 1864 to represent coal miners in Northumberland, following the collapse of a short-lived union covering both Northumberland and Durham miners.  Originally named the Northumberland Miners' Mutual Confident Association, it aimed for respectability, requiring high subscriptions and avoiding strikes.  It did not affiliate to the national body, the Miners' Federation of Great Britain, until 1907.  In 1945, this became the National Union of Mineworkers, and the association became its Northumberland Area.  This was dissolved in 2018.

General Secretaries
1864: William Crawford
1865: Thomas Burt
1913: William Straker
1935: Jim Bowman
1950: Robert Main
1975: Sammy Scott
1985:
1992: Ian Lavery
2010: Denis Murphy

Presidents
John Nixon
1872: William Grieves
John Bryson
John Nixon
1896: Hugh Boyle
1907: Joseph English
1914: William Weir
1927: William Golightly
1940: Hugh McKay

1960s: Tom Holliday
1977:
1980s: Denis Murphy

Financial Secretaries
1906: John Cairns
1918: Ebby Edwards
1929: John Carr
1939: Jack Besford

Footnotes

References
National Union of Mineworkers, Northumberland Miners 1919-1939

External links
 Catalogue of NMMCA archives held at the Modern Records Centre, University of Warwick

Mining trade unions
History of mining in the United Kingdom
National Union of Mineworkers (Great Britain)
Politics of Northumberland
1864 establishments in England
Mining in England
Trade unions established in 1864
Trade unions disestablished in 2018
Trade unions based in Tyne and Wear